Spicks and Specks was an Australian music-themed comedic television quiz show, a revival of the original Spicks and Specks series that was telecast on ABC1 for seven seasons and 277 episodes.

The new show started on Wednesday 5 February 2014. It was recorded and produced at the ABC Broadcasting Studios in Elsternwick, Victoria.

On 30 May 2014, ABC programmer Brendan Dahill announced that the show would not be renewed for a second season because it "hasn't resonated with viewers to the degree we had hoped." The show was pulled from the schedule after episode 20 had screened, with the final six shows of the 26 shows recorded airing during late 2014. The reason why this happened was because Josh Earl's second child was born at this point.

Premise of the show 
The show was hosted by stand-up comedian Josh Earl, who posed questions to two teams each headed by permanent team captains, singer/songwriter Ella Hooper and radio presenter/comedian Adam Richard. The overall style of the show is a mix of music and comedy. The revival included a refreshed format and new games.

Delayed relaunch 
The revival of the show was originally announced in November 2012, during the ABC 2013 program launch but the network decided to delay the relaunch until 2014. ABC executives were reportedly upset when news of the return of the show in 2014 was prematurely leaked before the intended official announcement.

References

External links

Australian Broadcasting Corporation original programming
Australian panel games
Australian comedy television series
Australian music television series
Australian television series revived after cancellation
2014 Australian television series debuts
2014 Australian television series endings
Television shows set in Melbourne
2010s Australian game shows
Musical game shows
English-language television shows
Television game shows with incorrect disambiguation